La Victoire is a commune in the Saint-Raphaël Arrondissement, in the Nord department of Haiti. It has 6,421 inhabitants.

References

Populated places in Nord (Haitian department)
Communes of Haiti